Triangeln Station is an underground railway station in Malmö, Sweden. It is located in central Malmö, close to St. John's Church and to Triangeln (literally "The Triangle") square, with the neighbourhoods Möllevången and Pildammsparken in its vicinity. The station opened in December 2010 as a part of the newly built Citytunneln along with Hyllie railway station and a new underground part of Malmö Central Station.

Gallery

References

City Tunnel
Railway stations located underground in Malmö
Buildings and structures in Malmö
Railway stations opened in 2010
21st-century establishments in Skåne County